Spiny jewel box is a name for several small clams in the genus Arcinella, especially:
 Arcinella arcinella, the Caribbean spiny jewel box
 Arcinella cornuta, the spiny jewel box, or Florida spiny jewel box

Animal common name disambiguation pages